General elections were held in Republika Srpska on 1 October 2006, as part of the general elections across Bosnia and Herzegovina.

Results

President

National Assembly

External links
Bosnian Electoral Commission
Bosnia’s “Historic” Elections: The Usual Tensions, Plus a Seed of Hope, Washington Report on Middle East Affairs, December 2006

Elections in Republika Srpska
Republika Srpska
General election
Election and referendum articles with incomplete results